Thomas J. McDonald (June 21, 1883 – June 11, 1931) was an American reporter and politician from New York.

Life 
McDonald was born on June 21, 1883, in Mount Vernon, New York. His father, John McDonald, was one of the pioneer settlers of Mount Vernon and fought in the American Civil War.

McDonald worked as a reporter for The Daily Eagle in Mount Vernon. After the paper failed, he began writing for newspapers all over New England. He then returned to New York, settling in Wakefield and worked as advertising manager for the North Side News.

In 1917, McDonald was elected to the New York State Assembly as a Democrat, representing the Bronx County 6th District. He served in the Assembly in 1918, 1919, 1920, 1921, 1922, 1923, 1924, 1925, 1926, and 1927. In 1927, he was elected New York City alderman. He was reelected in 1929.

McDonald was married. He had a son, Thomas J. Jr. He was a member of the Knights of Columbus, the Royal Arcanum, the Loyal Order of Moose, and the Irish Federation.

McDonald died at home of pneumonia on June 11, 1931. He was buried in Woodlawn Cemetery.

References

External links 

 The Political Graveyard

1883 births
1931 deaths
Politicians from Mount Vernon, New York
Politicians from the Bronx
Journalists from New York City
20th-century American journalists
American male journalists
20th-century American politicians
Democratic Party members of the New York State Assembly
New York City Council members
Catholics from New York (state)
Deaths from pneumonia in New York (state)
Burials at Woodlawn Cemetery (Bronx, New York)